Damu is a name.

Given name 

 Damu Cherry (1977-), American hurdler
 Damu Kenkre, Indian director
 Damu Smith (1951–2006), American peace activist

Family name 

 Irkab-Damu, King of Ebla
 Isar-Damu, King of Ebla
 Jimi Damu (1967–2018), Fijian rugby player
 Kun-Damu, King of Ebla
 Xiong Damu, Ming Dynasty novelist and historian

Other 

 Damu the Fudgemunk (1984-), American musician
 Suresh Damu Bhole, Indian politician